Club de Fútbol Independiente Alicante is a Spanish football club based in Alicante in the Valencian Community.

History
Founded in 2014 as an heir to Alicante CF, adopting their colors and logo, CFI Alicante began to play in the Segunda Regional, the lowest tier of the Valencian regional divisions. After achieving promotion to Primera Regional in 2016, the club first reached the Regional Preferente in 2018.

In 2021, after having economic problems, the club reached a collaboration agreement with CF Intercity. The club played in the 2021–22 Copa del Rey, being knocked out by Real Betis.

On 14 July 2022, CFI Alicante reached another agreement with Intercity, to act as their reserve team for the 2022–23 season.

Season to season

References

External links
 

2014 establishments in Spain
Association football clubs established in 2014
Football clubs in the Valencian Community
Sport in Alicante